Robby McGehee (born July 20, 1973) is an American former race car driver. He competed in the Indy Racing League and won the Indianapolis 500 Rookie of the Year award in 1999 after finishing fifth. He then raced for veteran owner Fred Treadway the next few seasons. By 2002 Treadway's team had closed and McGehee bounced around several teams and last raced in the Indianapolis 500 for PDM Racing in 2004.

McGehee got started in racing in 1994 when he went to Skip Barber Racing School with his mother. McGehee finished second in the Formula 2000 series Road to Indy Oval Crown series, including wins at Homestead-Miami Speedway and Atlanta Motor Speedway in 1998.

The 1999 VisionAire 500K at Charlotte was the first IndyCar race he qualified for, starting 13th. The race however, was cancelled after 79 laps due to spectator fatalities and struck from the record. McGehee was running 9th when the race was stopped. Later that month, the 1999 Indianapolis 500 would be his first official start in the IRL. He finished fifth in that race.  Later that week, Robby presented his Rookie of the Year trophy to team mechanic Steve Fried, who was severely injured in a pit lane accident during the race, while he was in the hospital.

In 2004, McGehee was to have a fully sponsored effort, but the deal fell through weeks before the race. He was able to get backing from a St. Louis business (his hometown) and eventually Burger King. In order to qualify, he had to sweat out a possible qualification effort by Tony Stewart that never came to pass.

Racing record

American open–wheel racing results
(key)

IndyCar Series

Indianapolis 500

References

External links
 http://rmracing.homestead.com/
Ball State Daily News Profile of Robby McGehee

1973 births
Living people
Indianapolis 500 Rookies of the Year
IndyCar Series drivers
Indianapolis 500 drivers
Racing drivers from Missouri
Racing drivers from St. Louis
Sportspeople from St. Louis
U.S. F2000 National Championship drivers
PDM Racing drivers
Panther Racing drivers
Cheever Racing drivers